The Covenant School (TCS) is a private Christian school. It is composed of the Birdwood Campus that houses the Lower School (Grades Pre-K—5), located in the former McIntire High School in Downtown Charlottesville, Virginia and the Hickory Campus, which is home to the Middle (Grades 6—8) and Upper (Grades 9—12) Schools. The Hickory Campus is nestled in the beautiful landscape of Albemarle County in a building completed in 2002.

History 
The Covenant School was founded in 1985, opening its doors with 46 students in Grades K-6. By 1987, a full K-12 program was offered. The school restructured as a K-8 school in 1990, then added Grade 9 in 1992, Grade 10 in 1994, Grade 11 in 1995, and Grade 12 in the fall of 1996, graduating 43 seniors in May 1997. A Pre-K program was added in the fall of 2003. Covenant has continued to offer Pre-K through 12th grade since this time. The 2007-2008 school year saw a peak enrollment of 710 students.

Traditions 
Chapel-amen
Every Wednesday at the Hickory and Birdwood Campus, the school community gathers in worship. At Birdwood, students and parents are actively involved in the service: leading music, reading Scripture, and reciting The Lord's Prayer. Arts performances by fifth-grade students include band, handbells, and choir. A weekly parent prayer time follows Chapel. At Hickory, this worship time includes a student-led music team, various readings from Scripture and historic Christian creeds, personal testimonies, and a message from the Chaplain, a teacher, or member of the community. A parent prayer time precedes Chapel each week.

House
In 2014 the school founded the House program. A quartet of communities named for the cardinal virtues of Temperance, Fortitude, Wisdom, and Justice, the House System stands at the center of fellowship on the Hickory Campus. Upon attending, each individual finds a home in one of the four Houses. The four house colors are red, dark green, light blue, and dark blue. House members seek to know, celebrate, serve, and love each other, fostering a positive culture that stands apart from the rest of the world. House also provides educational leadership and administrative opportunities for students through the House Leadership Team, a body of elected student officials and a faculty Head of House who shepherd their House throughout the year. Each House is led by a House Leadership Team—ten elected student leaders and a faculty Head of House who fulfill roles from president to community service coordinator to chaplain. The House motto is "For Others, For Christ".

Rock Ceremony
A culminating Lower School grade-level event, the Rock Ceremony is an opportunity for teachers to affirm each student with a Bible verse written on a smooth rock for them to keep. Verses are individualized for each student and represent their God-given gifts and talents.

Live Nativity
Held on the front lawn of the Birdwood Campus each December, this Christmas worship event with live animals and actors is open to the public.
The library is the best place to go to if you need a book or for aftercare

Athletics 

The Athletics Department has 19 athletic programs and 36 state championships. They are a Division II school in the Virginia Independent School Athletic Association (VISAA). Our teams compete in the Blue Ridge Conference (BRC) and the Virginia Independent Conference (VIC). On June 13, 2019, Jason Bennett was hired as the new Athletic Director. He comes with 20 years of experience as Athletic Director and Director of Student Activities from Chapelgate Christian Academy in Marriottsville, Maryland.

Championships

Notable alumni
Trevor Moore, member of sketch comedy troupe The Whitest Kids U' Know
Lindsay Shoop, Olympic gold medal-winning rower

References

External links

The Covenant School website

Private K-12 schools in Virginia
Educational institutions established in 1985
Schools in Charlottesville, Virginia
1985 establishments in Virginia